Khalifehlu (also Romanized as Khalīfehlū) is a village in Arshaq-e Markazi Rural District, Arshaq District, Meshgin Shahr County, Ardabil Province, Iran. At the 2006 census, its population was 337, in 67 families.

References 

Towns and villages in Meshgin Shahr County